Piano tuning is the act of adjusting the tension of the strings of an acoustic piano so that the musical intervals between strings are in tune. The meaning of the term 'in tune', in the context of piano tuning, is not simply a particular fixed set of pitches. Fine piano tuning requires an assessment of the vibration interaction among notes, which is different for every piano, thus in practice requiring slightly different pitches from any theoretical standard. Pianos are usually tuned to a modified version of the system called equal temperament. (See Piano key frequencies for the theoretical piano tuning.)

In all systems of tuning, every pitch may be derived from its relationship to a chosen fixed pitch, which is usually A440 (440 Hz), the note A above middle C. For a classical piano and musical theory, the middle C is usually labelled as C4 (as in scientific pitch notation); However, in the MIDI standard definition this middle C (261.626 Hz) is labelled C3. In practice, a MIDI software can label middle C as C3-C5, which can cause confusion, especially for beginners.

Piano tuning is done by a wide range of independent piano technicians, piano rebuilders, piano-store technical personnel, and hobbyists. Professional training and certification is available from organizations or guilds, such as the Piano Technicians Guild. Many piano manufacturers recommend that pianos be tuned twice a year.

Background

Many factors cause pianos to go out of tune, particularly atmospheric changes. For instance, changes in humidity will affect the pitch of a piano; high humidity causes the sound board to swell, stretching the strings and causing the pitch to go sharp, while low humidity has the opposite effect. Changes in temperature can also affect the overall pitch of a piano. In newer pianos the strings gradually stretch and wooden parts compress, causing the piano to go flat, while in older pianos the tuning pins (that hold the strings in tune) can become loose and not hold the piano in tune as well. Frequent and hard playing can also cause a piano to go out of tune. For these reasons, many piano manufacturers recommend that new pianos be tuned four times during the first year and twice a year thereafter.

An out-of-tune piano can often be identified by the characteristic "honky tonk" or beating sound it produces. This fluctuation in the sound intensity is a result of two (or more) tones of similar frequencies being played together. For example, if a piano string tuned to 440 Hz (vibrations per second) is played together with a piano string tuned to 442 Hz, the resulting tone beats at a frequency of 2 Hz, due to the constructive and destructive interference between the two sound waves. Likewise, if a string tuned to 220 Hz (with a harmonic at 440 Hz) is played together with a string tuned at 442 Hz, the same 2 Hz beat is heard. Because pianos typically have multiple strings for each piano key, these strings must be tuned to the same frequency to eliminate beats.

The pitch of a note is determined by the frequency of vibrations. For a vibrating string, the frequency is determined by the string's length, mass, and tension. Piano strings are wrapped around tuning pins, which are turned to adjust the tension of the strings.

History 
Piano tuning became a profession around the beginning of the 1800s, as the "pianoforte" became mainstream. Previously musicians owned harpsichords, which were much easier to tune, and which the musicians generally tuned themselves. Early piano tuners were trained and employed in piano factories, and often underwent an apprenticeship of about 5–7 years. Early tuners faced challenges related to a large variety of new and changing pianos and non-standardized pitches.

Historically, keyboard instruments were tuned using just intonation, pythagorean tuning and meantone temperament meaning that such instruments could sound "in tune" in one key, or some keys, but would then have more dissonance in other keys. The development of well temperament allowed fixed-pitch instruments to play reasonably well in all of the keys. The famous "Well-Tempered Clavier" by Johann Sebastian Bach took advantage of this breakthrough, with preludes and fugues written for all 24 major and minor keys. However, while unpleasant intervals (such as the wolf interval) were avoided, the sizes of intervals were still not consistent between keys, and so each key still had its own distinctive character. During the 1800s this variation led to an increase in the use of quasi- equal temperament, in which the frequency ratio between each pair of adjacent notes on the keyboard were nearly equal, allowing music to be transposed between keys without changing the relationship between notes.

Pianos are generally tuned to an A440 pitch standard that was adopted during the early 1900s in response to widely varying standards. Previously the pitch standards had gradually risen from about A415 during the late 1700s and early 1800s to A435 during the late 1800s. Though A440 is generally the standard, some orchestras, particularly in Europe, use a higher pitch standard, such as A442.

Theory

Overtones and harmonics

A stretched string can vibrate in different modes, or harmonics, and when a piano hammer strikes a string it excites multiple harmonics at the same time. The first harmonic (or fundamental frequency) is usually the loudest, and determines the pitch that is perceived. In theory the higher harmonics (also called overtones or partials) vibrate at integer multiples of the fundamental frequency. (e.g. a string with a fundamental frequency of 100 Hz would have overtones at 200 Hz, 300 Hz, 400 Hz, etc.) In reality, the frequencies of the overtones are shifted up slightly, due to inharmonicity caused by the stiffness of the strings.

The relationship between two pitches, called an interval, is the ratio of their absolute frequencies. The easiest intervals to identify and tune are those where the note frequencies have a simple whole-number ratio (e.g. octave with a 2:1 ratio, perfect fifth with 3:2, etc.) because the harmonics of these intervals coincide and beat when they are out of tune. (For a perfect fifth, the 3rd harmonic of the lower note coincides with the 2nd harmonic of the top note.)

Temperament

The term temperament refers to a tuning system that allows intervals to beat instead of tuning pure or "just intervals". In equal temperament, for instance, a fifth would be tempered by narrowing it slightly, achieved by flattening its upper pitch slightly, or raising its lower pitch slightly.

Tempering an interval causes it to beat. Because the actual tone of a vibrating piano string is not just one pitch, but a complex of tones arranged in a harmonic series, two strings that are close to a simple harmonic ratio such as a perfect fifth beat at higher pitches (at their coincident harmonics), because of the difference in pitch between their coincident harmonics. Where these frequencies can be calculated, a temperament may be tuned aurally by timing the beatings of tempered intervals.

One practical method of tuning the piano begins with tuning all the notes in the "temperament" octave in the lower middle range of the piano. A tuner starts by using an external reference, usually an A440 tuning fork, (or commonly a C523.23 tuning fork) to tune a beginning pitch, and then tunes the other notes in the "temperament" using tempered interval relationships. During tuning it is common to assess fifths, fourths, thirds (both major and minor) and sixths (also major and minor), often playing the intervals in an ascending or descending pattern to hear whether an even progression of beat rates has been achieved.

Once the temperament octave is finished the tuner tunes the rest of the piano, working outward from the temperament, and using octaves and other intervals to align each note with notes that have already been tuned.

The following table lists theoretical beat frequencies between notes in an equal temperament octave. The top row indicates absolute frequencies of the pitches; usually only A440 is determined from an external reference. Every other number indicates the beat rate between any two tones (which share the row and column with that number) in the temperament octave. Slower beat rates can be carefully timed with a metronome, or other such device. For the thirds in the temperament octave, it is difficult to tune so many beats per second, but after setting the temperament and duplicating it one octave below, all of these beat frequencies are present at half the indicated rate in this lower octave, which are excellent for verification that the temperament is correct. One of the easiest tests of equal temperament is to play a succession of major thirds, each one a semitone higher than the last. If equal temperament has been achieved, the beat rate of these thirds should increase evenly in the temperament region.

The next table indicates the pitch at which the strongest beating should occur for useful intervals. As described above, when tuning a perfect fifth, for instance, the beating can be heard not at either of the fundamental pitches of the keys played, but rather an octave and fifth (perfect twelfth) above the lower of the two keys, which is the lowest pitch at which their harmonic series overlap. Once the beating can be heard, the tuner must temper the interval either wide or narrow from a tuning that has no beatings.

Stretch

The tuning described by the above beating plan provides a good approximation of equal temperament across the range of the temperament octave. If extended further, however, the actual tuning of the instrument becomes increasingly inaccurate because of inharmonicity, which causes harmonics to run slightly sharp, as increasingly higher tones in the harmonic series are reached. This problem is mitigated by "stretching" the octaves as one tunes above (and to an extent below) the temperament region. When octaves are stretched, they are tuned, not to the lowest coincidental overtone (second partial) of the note below, but to a higher one (often the 4th partial). This widens all intervals equally, thereby maintaining intervallic and tonal consistency.

All western music, but western classical literature in particular, requires this deviation from the theoretical equal temperament because the music is rarely played within a single octave. A pianist constantly plays notes spread over three and four octaves, so it is critical that the mid and upper range of the treble be stretched to conform to the inharmonic overtones of the lower registers. Since the stretch of octaves is perceived and not measured, the tuner is aware of which octave needs "more" or "less" stretching. A good tuning requires compromise between tonal brilliance, intonation and an awareness of gradation of tone through the compass of the instrument. The amount of stretching necessary to achieve this is a function of string scaling, a complex determination based on the string's tension, length, and diameter. The Railsback curve is the result of measuring the fundamental frequencies of stretched tunings and plotting their deviations from unstretched equal temperament.  

In small pianos the inharmonicity is so extreme that establishing a stretch based on a triple octave makes the single octaves beat noticeably, and the wide, fast beating intervals in the upper treble—especially major 17ths—beat wildly. By necessity the tuner will attempt to limit the stretch. In large pianos like concert grands, less inharmonicity allows for a more complete string stretch without negatively affecting close octaves and other intervals. So while it may be true that the smaller piano receives a greater stretch relative to the fundamental pitch, only the concert grand's octaves can be fully widened so that triple octaves are beatless. This contributes to the response, brilliance and "singing" quality that concert grands offer.

A benefit of stretching octaves is the correction of dissonance that equal temperament imparts to the perfect fifth. Without octave stretching, the slow, nearly imperceptible beating of fifths in the temperament region (ranging from little more than one beat every two seconds to about one per second) would double each ascending octave. At the top of the keyboard, then, the theoretically (and ideally) pure fifth would be beating more than eight times per second. Modern western ears easily tolerate fast beating in non-just intervals (seconds and sevenths, thirds and sixths), but not in perfect octaves or fifths. Happily for pianists, the string stretch that accommodates inharmonicity on a concert grand also nearly exactly mitigates the accumulation of dissonance in the perfect fifth.

Other factors, physical and psychoacoustic, affect the tuner's ability to achieve a temperament. Among physical factors are inharmonic effects due to soundboard resonance in the bass strings, poorly manufactured strings, or peculiarities that can cause "false beats" (false because they are unrelated to the manipulation of beats during tuning). The principal psychoacoustic factor is that the human ear tends to perceive the higher notes as being flat when compared to those in the midrange. Stretching the tuning to account for string inharmonicity is often not sufficient to overcome this phenomenon, so piano tuners may stretch the top octave or so of the piano even more.

Tools and methods

Common tools for tuning pianos include the tuning lever or "hammer", a variety of mutes, and a tuning fork or electronic tuning device. The tuning lever is used to turn and 'set' the tuning pins, increasing or decreasing the tension of the string. Mutes are used to silence strings that are not being tuned. While tuning the temperament octave, a felt strip is typically placed within the temperament (middle) section of the piano; it is inserted between each note's trichord, muting its outer two strings so that only the middle string is free to vibrate.  A Papps mute performs the same function in an upright piano and is placed through the piano action to mute either the 2 left strings (of a trichord), or the 2 right strings similarly.  After the center strings are all tuned (or right if a Papps mute is used) the felt strip can be removed note by note, tuning the outer strings to the center strings. Wedge-shaped mutes are inserted between two strings to mute them, and the Papps mute is commonly used for tuning the high notes in upright pianos because it slides more easily between hammer shanks.

In an aural tuning a tuning fork is used to tune the first note (generally A4) of the piano, and then a temperament octave is tuned between F3 and F4 using a variety of intervals and checks, until the tuner is satisfied that all the notes in the octave are correctly tuned. The rest of the piano is then tuned to the temperament octave, using octaves and other intervals as checks.

If an electronic tuning device is used, the temperament step might be skipped, as it is possible for the tuner to adjust notes directly with the tuning device in any reasonable order.

See also
 Piano acoustics
 Institute of Musical Instrument Technology
 Pseudo-octave
 Stretched tuning

Notes

References
 . 1954, 1885. .

External links
 How to tune a piano
 Midrange Piano Tuning, Octave Types and Distribution
 Procedure For Tuning A Piano
 History of Piano Tuning Gill Green MA
 How often should a piano be tuned

Musical tuning
Piano
Articles containing video clips